Samuel Kounaves is an American researcher, academic and author. He is a Professor of Chemistry and adjunct Professor in Earth & Ocean Sciences at Tufts University. He also holds a visiting professorship at Imperial College London since 2014, a Consulting Scientist position at the Technical University of Berlin, and is an affiliate scientist at NASA’s Jet Propulsion Laboratory.

Kounaves' research efforts have been focused on the development and application of micro-electroanalytical sensors and techniques for environmental and planetary chemical analysis. Some of his research has dealt with the electrochemical analyses of the soil/ice constituents of Earth and Mars. He has written over 120 articles.

Kounaves is a fellow of the American Association for the Advancement of Science, of the Royal Society of Chemistry and of The Geological Society. In 2019, he received the ACS Kavli Foundation Award for innovations in Chemistry.

Education 
Kounaves received his BS in Chemistry in 1975 and his MS in Chemistry in 1978, both from California State University at San Diego. At the time, he was working as a research chemist at the U.S. Naval Ocean Systems Center. He received his PhD (DSc) from the University of Geneva in 1985 under the guidance of Jacques Buffle, while working for two years as a Scientific Associate at the European Organization for Nuclear Research (CERN). He subsequently did a post-doctoral fellowship at SUNY Buffalo with Janet Osteryoung in 1986, and the following two years at Harvard University School of Medicine with James Young.

Career 
In 1988, Kounaves joined the Department of Chemistry at Tufts University as an Assistant Professor, becoming Associate Professor in 1994 and Full Professor in 2012. From 1994 to 2002, he was a faculty researcher at the Center for Field Analytical Studies & Technology.

Research and work 
In the 1980 and 90's, Kounaves' research efforts were focused on the development and application of micro-electroanalytical sensors and techniques for environmental analysis. He demonstrated that a microlithographcally fabricated iridium-based ultramicroelectrode (Ir-UME) array can be constructed and used in conjunction with square wave anodic stripping voltammetry (SWASV), to rapidly and accurately measure environmentally significant heavy metals in natural waters at concentrations in the ppb range. He also carried out basic scientific studies involving the analytical utility of the Ir-UME, the effects of electrode surface morphology on the electrochemical signal, and the theoretical derivation and numerical simulation of the SWASV technique at the Ir-UME.

He also demonstrated the utility of Ir-UME sensors for rapid in-situ determination in natural water of copper, lead, cadmium and zinc, selenium, nickel, arsenic, for direct determination of copper and mercury, and developed a unique solid-state reference electrode to use with in-situ measurements. In parallel with the application of these sensors, Kounaves also conducted fundamental studies to understand the effects of the fabrication materials, the effects of mercury deposition on surface degradation, the failure of Ir-UMEs in chloride media and the surface effects on electron transfer rates.

In 2003, Kounaves, as part of a team, was chosen by NASA as a Co-Investigator to lead the 2007 Phoenix Mars Scout Lander mission and as the Lead Investigator for the wet chemistry experiments. As part of the Phoenix science team, he was responsible for and led the chemical investigation and interpretation of the Mars Wet Chemistry Lab (WCL) inorganic and electrochemical analyses of the soil/ice constituents, their relationship to past/present Martian geochemistry, and the potential of the Martian environment to support microbial life. As Co-PI and Lead Scientist for WCL onboard NASA's Phoenix Mars Lander, Kounaves and his group performed the first wet chemical analysis of martian soil. The experiments revealed an alkaline soil containing a variety of soluble minerals, but most surprising was the discovery of almost 1% perchlorate,.

After discovering  on Mars, Kounaves group began investigating the same possibility in Antarctica's McMurdo Dry Valleys. Their research provided the evidence of the ubiquitous natural formation of perchlorate on Earth, with accumulation in arid environments and global atmospheric production. Their discovery supports the hypothesis that the perchlorate reducing bacteria and archaea may be a remnant of a significant pre-oxygen Earth perchlorate ecosystem.

Some of Kounaves' recent NASA funded research deals with understanding the geochemical and environmental history as recorded by the chemistry of planetary surface materials, the chemistry of the UV-driven production of perchlorate on Mars and its effects on organic  compounds, and the geobiochemistry in extreme environments on Earth in places such as the McMurdo and other Antarctica Dry Valleys, Death Valley, the Tindouf Basin (Morocco), and the Atacama Desert (Chile). His group has also been funded by major NASA COLDTech and ICEE2 grants to develop a chemical sensor array to study the geochemistry, subglacial ocean chemistry, and habitability of Saturn's moon Enceladus by analysis of the ejected plume material and the surface ice on Europa.

Awards and honors 
1986 - National Research Council, Research Fellowship 
1990 - Tufts Junior Faculty Fellowship 
2006 - Arno Heyn Memorial Award, NE Section of the American Chemical Society
2006 - Wood Colloquium Lecture, Aerospace Sciences, University of Colorado
2008 - Massachusetts Columbus Quincentennial Exploration & Discovery Award for Innovative Achievement  
2009 - John L. "Jack" Swigert Jr., Award for Space Exploration as member of the Phoenix Mars Mission Team
2009 - NASA Group Achievement Award for Development and Operation of the Phoenix Spacecraft Leading to the First Landing in the Martian Arctic
2009 - NASA Group Achievement Award for Outstanding Performance in the Planning and Execution of the Science for the Phoenix Mars Mission 
2013 - Fellow, American Association for the Advancement of Science
2015 - Fellow, Royal Society of Chemistry
2016 - Fellow, The Geological Society 
2019 - NASA Exceptional Achievement Award for New Opportunities to ELSHA Team
2019 - ACS-Kavli Award for Innovations in Chemistry

Selected papers 
Boynton, W. V., Ming, D. W., Kounaves, S. P., Young, S. M. M., Arvidson, R. E., Hecht, M. H., Morris, R. V. (2009). Evidence for Calcium Carbonate at the Mars Phoenix Landing Site. Science, 325(5936), 61–64.
Carrier, B. L. & Kounaves, S. P. (2015) The Origins of Perchlorate in the Martian Soil. Geophysical Research Letters, 42, 3739-3745
Catling, D. C., Claire, M. W., Zahnle, K. J., Quinn, R. C., Clark, B. C., Hecht, M. H., & Kounaves, S. (2010). Atmospheric origins of perchlorate on Mars and in the Atacama. Journal of Geophysical Research, 115.
Feeney, R., & Kounaves, S. P. (2000). On-Site Analysis of Arsenic in Groundwater Using a Microfabricated Gold Ultramicroelectrode Array. Analytical Chemistry, 72(10), 2222–2228.
Hecht, M. H., Kounaves, S. P., Quinn, R. C., West, S. J., Young, S. M. M., Ming, D. W., … Smith, P. H. (2009). Detection of Perchlorate and the Soluble Chemistry of Martian Soil at the Phoenix Lander Site. Science, 325(5936), 64–67.
Herdan, J., Feeney, R., Kounaves, S. P., Flannery, A. F., Storment, C. W., Kovacs, G. T. A., & Darling, R. B. (1998). Field Evaluation of an Electrochemical Probe for in Situ Screening of Heavy Metals in Groundwater. Environmental Science & Technology, 32(1), 131–136.
Kounaves, S. P., Stroble, S. T., Anderson, R. M., Moore, Q., Catling, D. C., Douglas, S., … Zent, A. P. (2010). Discovery of Natural Perchlorate in the Antarctic Dry Valleys and Its Global Implications. Environmental Science & Technology, 44(7), 2360–2364.
Kounaves, S. P., Hecht, M. H., Kapit, J., Gospodinova, K., DeFlores, L., ... Young, S. M. (2010) The Wet Chemistry Experiments on the 2007 Phoenix Mars Scout Lander Mission: Data Analysis and Results. Journal of Geophysical Research, 115, E00E10.
Maus, D.J., J. Heinz, J. Schirmack, J., Airo, A., Kounaves, S. P., Wagner, D., & Schulze-Makuch, D. (2020). Methanogenic Archaea Can Produce Methane in Deliquescence-Driven Mars Analog Environments, Nature Science Reports, 10(6).
Nolan, M. A., & Kounaves, S. P. (1999). Microfabricated Array of Iridium Microdisks as a Substrate for Direct Determination of Cu2 or Hg2 Using Square-Wave Anodic Stripping Voltammetry. Analytical Chemistry, 71(16), 3567–3573.

References 

Living people
American scientists
Tufts University faculty
San Diego State University alumni
University of Geneva alumni
Year of birth missing (living people)
People associated with CERN